Libya Center for Gifted Students or "LCGS" formally known as Al-Fateh Center for Gifted Students or "FCGS" is a public School located in Benghazi, Libya serving students from 8th grade through 12th grade who are identified as academically gifted.

History
The LCGS was established in 1993 with the aim of offering secondary education for students who are identified as academically gifted in the area of Benghazi.

Activities
 On September 2, 2010, and for two days, the school's graduated and current students held The First Scientific Conference. The students who participants in this conference, gave presentations on various topics, the topics include engineering, medical, information technology. There were ten topics, each participant took twenty minutes to present the subject, afterward, a five-minute discussion was held where the audience had the chance to ask questions and feedbacks.

References

External links
Official website
Facebook group

Educational institutions established in 1993
F
F
1993 establishments in Libya